The 2001 Austrian Figure Skating Championships were the national championships of the 2000–01 figure skating season. Skaters competed in the disciplines of men's singles, ladies' singles, and ice dancing. The results were used to choose the Austrian teams to the 2001 World Championships and the 2001 European Championships.

Senior results

Men

Ladies

Ice dancing

External links
 results

Austrian Figure Skating Championships
2000 in figure skating
Austrian Figure Skating Championships, 2001
Figure skating